

1976

External links
 Soviet films of 1976 at the Internet Movie Database

1976
Soviet
Films